Wushi Town is a town in Xiangtan County, Hunan, China.

Administrative division
As of 2017, the town is divided into thirteen villages and one community, the following areas: 
 Waziping Community
 Daming
 Shuangmiao
 Wushi
 Pingshan
 Yuechongqiao
 Hualong
 Tianlong
 Zhongxing
 Jinxiu
 Shifeng
 Wushifeng
 Jingquan
 Simei

History
In the Qing dynasty (1644–1911), it belonged to Yisu Township. 

In 1935, it came under the jurisdiction of the 8th District.

After the establishment of the Communist State, in 1950, it was under the jurisdiction of the 6th District. In 1958, the townships of Baituo, Wushi and Jingquan merged to form the Weiguo People's Commune. In 1995, former Wushi Township and Jingquan Township merged to form Wushi Township. In 1998 it was upgraded to a town. On November 17, 2017, it was listed among the fifth group of "National Civilized Villages and Towns" by the Office of the Central Guidance Commission for Building Spiritual Civilization of the Communist Party of China.

Geography
It lies at the southwestern of Xiangtan County, bordering Xiangxiang to the west, Paitou Township to the south, Shitan Town to the north, and Jinshi Township to the east.
  
The town enjoys a subtropical humid monsoon climate, enjoying four distinct seasons and abundant precipitation.

It is one of the 72 peaks of Heng Mountains.

Economy
Tea, corn, daylily and peanut are important to the economy.

Demographics

As of 2017, the National Bureau of Statistics of China estimates the township's population now to be 27,143.

Attractions
The Former Residence of Peng Dehuai, was built in Qing dynasty, also a scenic spot in the town.

Culture
Huaguxi is the most influence local theater.

Transport
The G0421 Xuchang–Guangzhou Expressway is a north–south highway in the town.

Celebrity
Peng Dehuai, a prominent Chinese Communist military leader, and served as China's Defense Minister from 1954 to 1959.

Gallery

References

Divisions of Xiangtan County